The 2022 Yokohama F. Marinos season was the club's 50th season in existence and the 40th consecutive season in the top flight of Japanese football. In addition to the domestic league, Yokohama F. Marinos participated in this season's editions of the Emperor's Cup, the J.League Cup and the AFC Champions League.

Players

First-team squad 

DSP
DSP
Type 2
Type 2
Type 2
Type 2

Out on loan

Pre-season and friendlies

Competitions

Overall record

J1 League

League table

Results summary

Results by round

Matches 
The league fixtures were announced on 21 January 2022.

Emperor's Cup

J.League Cup

Quarter-finals

AFC Champions League

Group stage

Knockout stage

Goalscorers

References

External links 
 Official website 

Yokohama F. Marinos seasons
Yokohama F. Marinos